Two pharaohs of Ancient Egypt's 29th dynasty shared the name Nepherites:

Nepherites I (ruled 399–393 BC)
Nepherites II (ruled 380 BC)